The Georgia's Rome Challenger is a professional tennis tournament played on indoor hard courts. It is currently part of the Association of Tennis Professionals (ATP) Challenger Tour. It has been held in Rome, Georgia, United States since 2022.

Past finals

Singles

Doubles

References

ATP Challenger Tour
Hard court tennis tournaments
Tennis tournaments in the United States
Recurring sporting events established in 2022